Alan White (3 January 1925 – 4 October 2013) was an Australian actor who worked extensively in radio and on stage. He later moved to England and had a successful career there. He was mentored by Peter Finch.

His television credits included Ghost Squad, Danger Man, Man in a Suitcase, The Prisoner (in the episode Dance of the Dead), The Champions, Doctor Who serial The Tenth Planet. He also appeared in a number of British films, including No Time for Tears (1957) and Seven Keys (1961).

References

External links

Alan White's Australian theatre credits at AusStage
Alan White at National Film and Sound Archive

Australian male stage actors
1925 births
2013 deaths
Australian male voice actors